Souleymane Demba (born June 17, 1991 in Lusaka) is a Zambian-born Malian footballer .

Early life
Demba was born in Lusaka, Zambia, child of Zambian mother Lafe Zimba and Malian father Moussa Demba. he starts his football forming in Nojo Sports Football School in Bamako before joining Raja Casablanca's formation center in Morocco when he was 14 years old.

Club career
Demba starts his professional career on September 27, 2009 when he entered for playing in the middle after expulsion of Nabil Masloub against KAC Kenitra, the final result was 2–0 for Raja Casablanca.

On October 4, 2009, Demba was chosen with the start team for the first time in Fez against Widad Fez, he played all the match which was ended with a draw between the two teams.

His start on the African Champions League was on February 14, 2010 when he substituted his teammate Baqlal during the second half of the match against Fello Star in Guinean capital Conakry.

Career statistics
As of 9 May 2010

References

External links 
 Demba's Profile and Statistics

Malian footballers
Raja CA players
Association football midfielders
1991 births
Expatriate footballers in Morocco
Expatriate footballers in Saudi Arabia
Expatriate footballers in Oman
Oman Professional League players
Al-Nahda Club (Oman) players
Al-Qaisumah FC players
Abha Club players
Al-Kholood Club players
Saudi First Division League players
Saudi Second Division players
Botola players
Living people
Sportspeople from Lusaka
SCC Mohammédia players
21st-century Malian people